Richard Brubker was a 14th-century English politician.

Brunker was a Member of Parliament for Devizes, Wiltshire in 1394. Nothing else is recorded of him.

References

Year of birth missing
Year of death missing
14th-century births
14th-century English politicians
English MPs 1394
People from Devizes